This is the discography of American DJ and producer Todd Terry.

Albums

Extended plays

Singles

Selected remixes
Basement Jaxx - "Fly Life"
Björk - "Hyperballad"
Boston Bun - "Don't Wanna Dance"
Roberto Surace - "Joys"
Tom Walker - "Better Half of Me"
Todd Terry featuring The Raid - "Jump Up in the Air"
Todd Terry - "Can U Dig It"
Steve Aoki featuring Rich the Kid and ILoveMakonnen - "How Else"
Melanie C - "Overload"

References

Discographies of American artists
House music discographies